"I Wanna" is a song by American rock band the All-American Rejects, released as the third and final single from their third studio album When the World Comes Down on June 8, 2009.

Background
"I Wanna" was written by Nick Wheeler and Tyson Ritter in Florida, United States and was one of the first songs to be written and recorded for When the World Comes Down within a six-month time period both in the studio and the band's tour bus and was refined by Ritter numerous times before recording began.

In an interview with Take 40 Australia, Wheeler said "Tyson came up with the idea on the road while we were touring Move Along. Two years straight on the road, barely going home. And when all you see is planes, buses, cars, insides of venues, dressing rooms and hotels... it starts to feel like a prison. That's kinda what the song's about... you're locked away in this hole and all you wanna do is touch somebody."

Reception

Critical reception
The song received mixed reviews from music critics. The Impressive Inklings praised the song as an album opener and praised Ritter's vocal work as "impressive", while Marshall Lately stated that the track is "a playful opener on the junior effort" and "is repetitive without being annoying, which is seldom found in pop ditties, [it] shows lyrically that they know where they came from, but also where they’re going."

Sputnikmusic were more negative, stating "'I Wanna' has enough cringe-inducing lyrics to fill a Mariah Carey song and Ritter’s delivery is bored, at best. It feels as though AAR is tired with this same old song-and-dance routine."

Chart performance
Worldwide, "I Wanna" achieved moderate success, peaking at #42 and #45 in Austria and Germany respectively and #84 in the United Kingdom. In Australia, the song became the All-American Rejects' second-highest charting single in that territory - following "Gives You Hell" - peaking at #15. It also charted in the country's year-end Top 100 Singles at #88.

In the United States, "I Wanna" charted at #32 on the Billboard Mainstream Top 40 and #23 on the Adult Top 40 charts respectively in late August 2009, it eventually reached #95 on the Hot 100 the following month.

Music video
A music video for "I Wanna" was directed by Rich Lee and was shot in June 2009 and was released a month later in mid-July. It primarily features the band performing the song on the set of their I Wanna Rock Tour stage set-up with neon lights, while scenes of a couple listening to music and sitting in a car are overlapped through the video, leading to them performing sexual intercourse.

A second version, directed by Paul Hunter, was released October 13, 2009. It revolves around a house party with the band where lead singer and bassist Tyson Ritter encounters his ex-girlfriend (played by Julianna Guill) with a new boyfriend (played by Landon Ashworth). Throughout the video, a series of videos and transitions are shown  on LG cell phones that show the video both through them and how Ritter and his girlfriend broke up. Towards the end, the All-American Rejects are seen performing in front of their party guests with Ritter and the ex-girlfriend crowd surfing towards each other in the audience and ultimately renewing their relationship when they reach each other.

Appearances in popular culture
"I Wanna" is featured in the film The House Bunny, which also stars Ritter as the character of Colby.

Track listing

Charts and certifications

Weekly charts

Year-end charts

Certifications

Release history

References

2008 songs
2009 singles
The All-American Rejects songs
Music videos directed by Paul Hunter (director)
Interscope Records singles
Song recordings produced by Eric Valentine
Songs written by Tyson Ritter
Songs written by Nick Wheeler
Music videos directed by Rich Lee

hu:I Wanna
fi:I Wanna
sv:I Wanna
tr:I Wanna